The 2018 SuperClásico Championship was a four-way international friendly soccer tournament that was held in Saudi Arabia, in which the Saudi team competes with Iraq, Argentina and Brazil in friendly matches at Prince Faisal bin Fahd Stadium and King Saud University Stadium in Riyadh, and King Abdullah Stadium in Jeddah. It was planned to be the national team of Egypt as the Arab competitor along with Saudi national team, but after the Egyptian team apologized, the Iraq team was invited to participate in its place and hesitated to participate for its commitment to other matches, then announced its welcome to participate, and the FIFA officially included all the matches of this championship in his agenda for October 2018.

Participants 
  Argentina
  Brazil
  Iraq
  Saudi Arabia

Format 
Teams played each other once during the FIFA Calendar. with considering Argentina versus Brazil match as a part of Superclásico de las Américas.

Standings

Matches

References 

International association football competitions hosted by Saudi Arabia
October 2018 sports events in Asia
2018–19 in Saudi Arabian football